Consort He may refer to:

Imperial consorts with the surname He

Empress He (Han dynasty) (died 189), wife of Emperor Ling of Han
Empress Dowager He (Eastern Wu) ( 242–264), Sun He's concubine and Sun Hao's mother
He Fani (339–404), Emperor Mu of Jin's wife
He Jingying ( 484–494), Xiao Zhaoye's wife
Empress He (Tang dynasty) (died 905), wife of Emperor Zhaozong of Tang

Imperial consorts with the title Consort He
Imperial Noble Consort Dunyi (1683–1768), concubine of the Kangxi Emperor
Consort He (Daoguang) (died 1836), concubine of the Daoguang Emperor

See also
Princess Dowager Helan (351–396), mother of Emperor Daowu of Northern Wei, Helan was later sinicized to He
Empress Xiaohui (Song) (929–958), surname He, Emperor Taizu of Song's first wife, died before he usurped the throne